Dianweli  or Dianwely (Jɔ́wⁿlè) is a rural commune in the Cercle of Douentza in the Mopti Region of Mali. The commune contains eight villages and had a population of 3,363 in the 2009 census. The main village (chef-lieu) is Dianwely Maoundé which is 8 km southeast of Douentza, the main town of the cercle.

Jamsay Dogon is spoken in the village.

References

External links
.
.

Communes of Mopti Region